The Hawthorne Historical Museum & Cultural Center is located at 7225 Southeast 221st Street, Hawthorne, Florida. It contains exhibits depicting the history of Hawthorne especially those military related. Within the building are many military grade vehicles including a tank. The building itself, constructed in 1907, was originally an African-American church.

Footnotes

External links

Hawthorne Historical Museum & Cultural Center (official website)

Museums in Alachua County, Florida
History museums in Florida